Xiqing District is a district in Tianjin, People's Republic of China.

History
The current Xiqing area came into existence in the mid and late Tang dynasty. In Northern Song (Song dynasty) period, this area was the border of Song and Liao (Liao dynasty). In Ming dynasty, this area was under control of Jinghai County and Wuqing County, Hejian Fu. In Qing dynasty, it was governed by Tianjin Fu. In 1912, after the founding of Republic of China, this area was named Tianjin County, Zhili Province.

After 1949, it became a special area of Hebei province and Yangliuqing became its center of governance. In 1952, this area became part of Tianjin Municipality. In 1953, it got its name Xijiaoqu (West Suburb). In 1992, it was named Xiqing District.

Geography
Xiqing District is located in the southwest of Tianjin Municipality, on the east bordering Hongqiao District, Nankai District, Hexi District, and Jinnan District, to the south across the Duliujian River facing Jinghai District, on the west bordering Wuqing District and Bazhou, Hebei, to the north sharing Ziya River with Beichen District.

Administrative divisions
There are 2 subdistricts and 7 towns in the district:

The total population of Xiqing is 310,000, among which 240,000 are rural citizens.

Transportation

Metro
Xiqing is currently served by two metro lines operated by Tianjin Metro:

  - Caozhuang
  - Nanzhan, Yangwuzhuang, Xuefugonguequ, Gaoxinqu, Daxuecheng

Education
Tianjin Korean International School (천진한국국제학교; 天津韩国国际学校) is located in the district.

References

External links

Official website of Xiqing District

Districts of Tianjin
1992 establishments in China